Moxos may refer to:

 Moxos plains, or Llanos de Moxos, a region of Bolivia
 Moxos Province, Bolivia
 Moxo people, an indigenous people of Bolivia
 Llanos de Moxos (archaeology)
 Jesuit Missions of Moxos
 Moxoene, or Moxos, an ancient Armenian province